Acrocercops archepolis is a moth of the family Gracillariidae. It is known from South Australia.

References

archepolis
Moths of Australia
Moths described in 1907